Progesterone test may refer to:
Quantification of the content of progesterone in a sample
Progestin challenge